Harmony Mill No. 3, also known as the "Mastodon Mill", is a historic mill located at Cohoes in Albany County, New York.  It was built in 1866–1868 and expanded 1871–1872.  It is a four-story red brick structure on a stone foundation, with an additional story under the distinctive mansard roof.  It features twin six story towers topped by mansard roofs and cast iron grillwork.  It was known as the "Mastodon Mill" for the skeleton of a mastodon found while excavating the north section.  It is the centerpiece of the Harmony Mills Historic District.

It was listed on the National Register of Historic Places in 1971.

References

External links

Industrial buildings and structures on the National Register of Historic Places in New York (state)
Industrial buildings completed in 1868
Buildings and structures in Albany County, New York
Historic American Engineering Record in New York (state)
Cotton mills in the United States
National Register of Historic Places in Albany County, New York
1868 establishments in New York (state)